Bombón may refer to:
 Bombón (Leslie Shaw song)
 Bombón (Daddy Yankee song)
 Bombón, a song by Bandana

See also
 Bombon (disambiguation)
 Bonbon (disambiguation)